Luis Antonio DeLeón Tricoche (born August 19, 1958, in Ponce, Puerto Rico) is a Puerto Rican former professional baseball pitcher.

DeLeón pitched 206 games over the first six seasons of his career, all in relief. He made his first and only start in his last career appearance, which was also his only major league appearance in 1989. Pitching for the Seattle Mariners, he threw four innings, giving up one run on five hits, and did not receive a decision.

DeLeón is the pitcher with the most appearances in Caribbean Series history. Pitching in 12 series throughout his career, he posted a 4–2 record and a 3.09 ERA in 61 innings of work, which includes a two-hit, complete game shutout against Mexico's Aguilas de Mexicali in the 1986 edition. he is also the second player with most seasons in the Puerto Rican Baseball League with 25.

In January 2011, he gained induction into the Caribbean Baseball Hall of Fame. Two months later, he was honored by the Ponce City Hall  for his great contribution to baseball in Puerto Rico. He was born in Barrio San Antón in Ponce.

Personal life
"Mambo", as his teammates nicknamed him, is also dubbed "The Millionaire from San Antón".

References

External links

1958 births
Albuquerque Dukes players
Arkansas Travelers players
Baltimore Orioles players
Calgary Cannons players
Iowa Cubs players
Johnson City Cardinals players
Las Vegas Stars (baseball) players
Living people
Major League Baseball pitchers
Major League Baseball players from Puerto Rico
Orlando Cubs players
Puerto Rican expatriate baseball players in Canada
Rochester Red Wings players
St. Louis Cardinals players
St. Petersburg Cardinals players
San Diego Padres players
Seattle Mariners players
Springfield Redbirds players
Sportspeople from Ponce, Puerto Rico
Tucson Toros players